Monty McCutchen (born February 14, 1966) is a former professional basketball referee who has worked in the National Basketball Association (NBA) since the 1993-1994 season.
  He is now the league Senior Vice President of Referee Development and Training.

NBA Finals Assignments
2017 Finals, Game 3 Golden State Warriors (118) @ Cleveland Cavaliers (113)

2016 Finals, Game 7 Cleveland Cavaliers (93) @ Golden State Warriors (89)

2016 Finals, Game 5 Cleveland Cavaliers (112) @ Golden State Warriors (97)

2016 Finals, Game 3 Golden State Warriors (90) @ Cleveland Cavaliers (120)

2015 Finals, Game 5: Cleveland Cavaliers (91) @ Golden State Warriors (104)

2015 Finals, Game 1: Cleveland Cavaliers (100) @ Golden State Warriors (108) (OT)

2014 Finals, Game 3: San Antonio Spurs (111) @ Miami Heat (92)

2013 Finals, Game 7: San Antonio Spurs (88) @ Miami Heat (95)

2013 Finals, Game 5: Miami Heat (104) @ San Antonio Spurs (114)

2013 Finals, Game 1: San Antonio Spurs (92) @ Miami Heat (88)

2012 Finals, Game 5: Oklahoma City Thunder (106) @ Miami Heat (121)

2012 Finals, Game 1: Miami Heat (94) @ Oklahoma City Thunder (105)

2011 Finals, Game 4: Miami Heat (83) @ Dallas Mavericks (86)

2010 Finals, Game 6: Boston Celtics (67) @ Los Angeles Lakers (89)

2010 Finals, Game 2: Boston Celtics (103) @ Los Angeles Lakers (94)

2009 Finals, Game 2: Orlando Magic (96) @ Los Angeles Lakers (101) (OT)

Personal life
McCutchen is married with two children and resides near Asheville, North Carolina. In the offseason, he is an avid photographer who is also active in ranching.
Before basketball, he was a substitute teacher at Thomas Edison middle school in south central Los Angeles. Currently working as the Head of Referee Training & Development at NBA.

References

National Basketball Association referees
Living people
1966 births
People from San Angelo, Texas
University of Texas at Arlington alumni
Continental Basketball Association referees